SM UB-155 was a German Type UB III submarine or U-boat built for the German Imperial Navy during World War I. She was never commissioned into the German Imperial Navy but surrendered to France on 9 March 1919 in accordance with the requirements of the Armistice with Germany and broken up at Brest in July 1921.

Construction

She was built by AG Vulcan of Hamburg and following just under a year of construction, launched at Hamburg on 26 October 1918. UB-155 carried 10 torpedoes and was armed with a  deck gun. UB-155 had a displacement of  while surfaced and  when submerged. Her engines enabled her to travel at  when surfaced and  when submerged.

References

Notes

Citations

Bibliography 

 

German Type UB III submarines
World War I submarines of Germany
1918 ships
Ships built in Hamburg